DCI Global Partnerships is a community of partners, projects and supporters that began in England, in 1985. DCI Global Partnerships is the name given to the community of people working with these projects, while the legal side is run by UK charity DCI Trust. The name DCI originates from the Greek words Doulos Christo Iesous meaning "Servant of Jesus Christ".

DCI Global Partnerships are responsible for several projects including the charity DCI Trust, Schools of Mission, the Christian World News Pages and a Banking for the Poorest ale e prea frumoasa.

DCI Projects

DCI Trust
DCI Trust is an international, inter-denominational charity committed to mobilising and training Christian leaders, providing micro-loans for the economically poor, powering networking in a global Christian constituency and giving to bless the poor of the earth. Its work includes:
Providing micro-funding for the local on-site creation of income
Funding for new mission to unreached people
Training for pastors and leaders
Help for people living in poverty, especially widows, orphans and children
Buildings for churches, schools and families
Schools for children and adults
Tools, so villagers can earn a living

Schools of Mission

Since 1987, DCI Global Partnerships has run a free diploma-level Internet training school. These studies, available in sixteen different languages, are in use worldwide and are to help people to learn and to teach others. The lessons are written by Dr. Les Norman, Th.D., M.Ph. and, since 1987, have been distributed free-of-charge to tens of thousands of students. The classes are now taught in hundreds of free or low-cost Schools of Mission in homes and churches across the developing world.

A quote from the DCI World News website says that:
"Our training has no walls, no frontiers and no fees, never has had any, never will."

Christian World News Pages
The Christian World News Pages:
"provides believers and interested readers worldwide with a means of sharing their plans successes and needs. A voice for the lost, the last and the least and for all who are reaching out to them… The news provides communication, opens eyes, creates unity and provides fuel for prayer and intercession for the present move of God in the world."

It is run in several languages, including:

'World Christian News' for the English-speaking world
'El Diario Misionero' for the  Spanish-speaking world
'O Jornal Missionário' for the Portuguese-speaking world
'Le Jornal Missionnaire' for the French-speaking world
'Surat-Surat Untuk Dunia' for the  Indonesian-speaking world
'Письма миру' in Russian

All of these are edited by volunteer translators across the world.

Banking for the Poorest
Provides no-interest micro-loans of start-up capital or animals, for those who are poor, destitute, landless, widows, orphans, and the victims of loan sharks, in order to create jobs and opportunity.

Missiological Analysis

Historical context
The work of DCI Trust began in the mid-1980s, on the backside of a period of history that Bosch describes as having "shaken Western civilization to the core." Globalization is in full stride; poverty and inequality have never been greater across the earth; modernity is giving way to post-modernity. Within its European heartlands, Christendom is giving way to a secular multiculturalism, whilst in Asia, Africa and South America, non-western Christianity is gaining new converts, energy and confidence at astonishing rates.

Thus, the forging of DCI's concerns and priorities has taken place in a period during which the world Christian mission movement has experienced both a growing urgency and awareness, as new technologies have allowed researchers and statisticians to investigate, analyse, assimilate and represent global trends with degrees of comprehension previously inaccessible—for example, in 1978 the global prayer-manual "Operation World," was first published; following which the evangelically-resistant belt of the "10/40 Window" was identified, focused upon and targeted—making the world's poorest, most neglected and most evangelically unreached peoples reachable as never before.

The social impact of DCI Global Partnerships
Against such a background, during the twenty-six years since its inception, DCI Trust has grown to represent an international, interdenominational community spanning five continents, touching people of over one-hundred different nationalities. Its vocational work focuses mainly upon the poor within developing nations, empowering them through leadership-training, micro-loans, business-development and community-building projects.

Through networking with committed, indigenous, localized individuals who are proven, responsible leaders, DCI has contributed towards a wide array of projects, including: "buildings for churches, schools and families; computers, camels…cars; farms, seeds…stock; medicines…operations; schools for children and adults; spectacles...tools…wheelchairs…workshops…bee-keeping…tree-planting…horticulture, home management, nutrition, HIV/AIDS training, fish farming, brick making, baking, disinfectant manufacture, tailoring courses, and skill training schools."

 Within Indonesia, DCI has partnered with Christian business people in the establishment of a small factory producing doormats, employing mainly Muslims and feeding profits back into the local church. In Burkina Faso, it has partnered with local people in the cultivation of a banana plantation, covering four hectares of dry, semi-desert land, producing local employment and a regular substantial harvest of this important "cash crop."
 Within Uganda, its partnership in developing a self-reproducing "goat bank" has witnessed phenomenal growth and interest: a local pastor reports: "Goats are God's project number one in this war zone of Africa. The report about (the) goat project is spreading like bush fire and we are optimistic about the effects and the result to the poor community."
 Within Aduku, in northern Uganda, a village banking project, begun with half-a-million Ugandan shillings in 2003, oversaw a series of micro-loans to widows and orphans—made so by war, terrorist violence and AIDS—resulting in the growth of the fund to two-and-a-half million shillings, by 2006, with no business failures. Children there now receive an education for the first time.

The mission praxis of DCI Global Partnerships

DCI World Christian Network's web portal is used to disseminate news submitted by subscribers and visitors to the website. Regular updates concerning profiled projects and people are disseminated to subscribers via email newsletter.

The website details the strategies towards which the resources of DCI Trust are devoted, namely: promoting and facilitating biblical training centers or "schools"; a range of "business for mission" projects and evangelistic support focusing upon unreached people groups and neglected members of society.

 The DCI "School Without Walls" resources offers a series of educational outlines divided into six divisions of evangelism, missions, discipleship, money, leadership and church growth, plus instructions on how to start a low-cost school. Each of 85 total lessons includes elements ideal for small groups, including bible memory-verses, discussion topics, homework, meditations, written diploma work, a biblical teaching and prayer prompts. Research has indicated that this format is ideal for use within developing nations where educational standards vary enormously, but where there is an insatiable hunger to learn.
 "Business for Mission" projects involve mainly micro-loans within Africa and India, through "bank for the poor" schemes, operated under the governance of a local committee, including the principal contact who has previously applied to the Trust for funding. The committee announce the availability, within a village or locality, of interest free or very low interest rate loans of $50 to $150. Schemes have a high rate of success, few loan defaulters and are regularly and easily reproduced in secondary locations.
 "Christmas Parties for the Poor" are annual events, sponsored by DCI, in which members of some of the poorest and most neglected communities, in places such as Malawi, Uganda, Peru, Indonesia, Thailand, Papua, Kenya and India are invited, at Christmas time, to a party where they receive food and gifts of clothing, books and seeds; hear the Good News about Jesus and experience joyful music and dance. Pocock writes: "For all the efficiency of rapid communication and… border obliterating technology, personal relationships and simple acts of kindness may, in the end, constitute the best strategies—and they may have the most appeal in a postmodern era."
 DCI's organisational modus operandi says DCI deliberately "owns no buildings and pays no salaries"; all work is done on a voluntary basis, with workers responsible for their own funding. The central Internet hub is managed from a home-office, while up to forty contributors around the world, responsible for translating news and "schools" pages into 17 languages, work out of homes or cyber-cafés, without any form of monetary remuneration, often without ever having met Trust staff face-to-face. A small core of supporters is responsible for the majority of financial contributions to the Trust's work.

The mission theory of DCI Global Partnerships
During its growth into a thriving network and movement, the Trust has developed a precise, post-modern, contextual theology of mission praxis, located within a series of instructions and teachings subtly scattered throughout the DCI website. This informal mission theory is supplemented by reference to developed, detailed teaching contained with the schools material. DCI stands firmly within the evangelical ‘faith mission’ heritage, with emphases upon faith; prayer; recognition and development of spiritual gifting; engagement in elements of ‘spiritual warfare’; motivation focusing upon God's glory, rather than escape from hell and a cultural sensitivity that places a strong emphasis on indigenous leadership and strategy.

An open, relationship-centred approach marks the DCI movement as essentially postmodern, as typified by this introduction to the ministry: "The movement has no formal leaders, elders or written constitution other than the Bible. We work together in friendship, supporting each other in God's call to different kinds of lifestyle and mission." This practical ecumenism is echoed in the warm welcome provided to Catholic visitors to the website, as well as the discreet place given to the formal statement of belief (Nicene Creed), but above all through the opportunities provided by the website, encouraging readers to act out their own faith, supplemented by the experience and resources offered by DCI.

Nevertheless, inside this "velvet-gloved" approach is a firm hand insisting, above all, on biblical standards of responsibility or stewardship from those who are offered partnership: "We look for a woman or a man with proven honesty and with a vision for serving the poor, and who also has the necessary spiritual and administrative skills." This focus upon leadership and community development through locally initiated, -managed and -accountable training centers echoes a trend which Pocock describes as an essential counterbalance for ‘inter-networking’ ministries powered by new technology, if they are to avoid "the dehumanizing tendency of globalization." Additionally, DCI's concentration upon biblical education constitutes a vital step towards transforming cultures towards a biblical worldview, something Miller considers an essential precursor to sustainable development.

In this context, DCI's focus upon financial partnership and economic development is under-girded by a biblically-based philosophy that envisages the whole task of mission as broader than vocal evangelism.

 For the poor, especially those receiving assistance, there is an emphasis upon "breaking the curse of poverty"—Miller refers to a ‘mindset of poverty’—and avoiding dependency through economic self-start initiatives. Thus, micro-loans are offered with the single, declared aim of "creating genuine self-employment through micro-industries or working from home with the sole goal of being able to raise the owner and the workers to a place of self-sufficiency in life and enabling them eventually to be generous towards others."
 For the rich there is an emphasis upon generosity toward the poor, based upon the text of Deuteronomy 15.7-11; financial supporters of ‘business for mission’ projects are encouraged to consider their giving to it as definite "investments" regarding which they should expect a return, made possible by the Lord's blessing, according to Luke 19.13ff. The concept of ‘Christmas parties for the poor’ is based decisively upon the story in Luke 14.
 For those wanting to ‘go’ or extend their mission activities there is a novel challenge, away from traditional "fund-raising," towards prayerful "friend-raising" and "fund-releasing".

Missiological observation
The manner and format of DCI Trust's work and growth represents many of the trends being increasingly discussed within Christian mission books, ‘blogs, newsletters and ministries, typifying the "new approaches to collaboration in training, funding and networking" increasingly required within a post-modern context. As such it represents an authentic, missiological, post-modern, intercultural Christian community involved in transforming the harsh reality of some of the world's most deprived communities.

Notes

References

Christian charities based in the United Kingdom